Al Istiyaf fi Lubnan (translation The Summer Season in Lebanon) is a Lebanese film directed by the Egypto-Lebanese Bishara Wakim in 1947.

References

External links

1947 films
Lebanese drama films
Lebanese black-and-white films